Christopher Okonkwo (born 29 April 1941) is a Nigerian athlete. He competed in the men's shot put at the 1972 Summer Olympics.

References

1941 births
Living people
Athletes (track and field) at the 1972 Summer Olympics
Nigerian male shot putters
Olympic athletes of Nigeria
Place of birth missing (living people)